Neuchâtel Trophy is an international, multi-level synchronized skating competition, held in Neuchâtel, Switzerland. Held for the first time in 1999, the competition is organized by Swiss Ice Skating and sanctioned by the International Skating Union.

Medalists

Senior teams

Junior teams

References

External links
 Official website of Neuchâtel Trophy

Synchronized skating competitions
Figure skating in Switzerland
Recurring sporting events established in 1999